Homburg (Saar) Hauptbahnhof is a railway station in the town of Homburg in the German state of Saarland. It is a through station with four platforms and seven platform tracks and is classified by Deutsche Bahn as a station of category 3. It is located at the junction of the Homburg–Neunkirchen line and the Mannheim–Saarbrücken line (Palatine Ludwig Railway). It has been the western terminus of line S1 of the Rhine-Neckar S-Bahn since 2006.

Location 
The station divides the town into two halves, separating Homburg-Mitte and Homburg-Erbach. It is about 700 metres away from the town centre. In front of the station area is the central bus station (ZOB), from which both regional and local buses operate.

History 
On 1 July 1848, the line between Kaiserslautern and Homburg was opened. Nine years later, on 7 May 1857, the Blies Valley Railway was opened to Zweibrücken. The Homburg–Rohrbach line, now part of the mainline between Mannheim and Saarbrücken, opened to traffic on 1 January 1904. The electrification of the railway station to Homburg was inaugurated on 8 March 1960. 31 years later, on 6 March 1991, the first EuroCity  service, the EC 56: Goethe, stopped in Homburg. A few days later, on 22 March 1991, the first InterCity (IC), the IC 26 stopped here. In the summer and autumn of 1991 the tracks were adapted for the operation of Intercity-Express trains, so that in January 1992, the first ICE (Type 1) ran to Homburg. In the following years, the station and the environment was modernised, including by the installation of electronic noticeboards for outgoing train and bus connections, lifts on all tracks and electronic noticeboards on platforms. Covered bicycle parking was also provided. Various platforms have been upgraded, including platform 1 as the normal platform for Rhine-Neckar S-Bahn services. In 2008, the modernisation of platforms 7 and 8 was completed.

Services

Long distance
Several services each day, classified as EuroCity (EC) or Intercity-Express (ICE) services, connect Homburg directly with Frankfurt am Main, Kassel, Dresden, Stuttgart, Munich, Salzburg and Graz. The ICE services on the Frankfurt–Paris route have not stopped here since December 2007.

Rapid transit and regional transportation

Freight 

Besides passenger services, eight tracks are allocated for freight operations. Two of the town’s three industrial areas are connected by sidings. There is also a siding on the line to Bexbach connecting to the site of the former army depot in Homburg.

Facilities 
The Deutsche Bahn travel centre is open daily. The station buildings have ticket machines, public telephones, lockers, toilets (including for the disabled), a bistro-cafe, a station bookshop, a restaurant and a photo booth.

Notes

External links 

Railway stations in the Saarland
Hauptbahnhof
Rhine-Neckar S-Bahn stations
Buildings and structures in Saarpfalz-Kreis
Railway stations in Germany opened in 1848